Events in the year 1998 in Italy.

Incumbents
President - Oscar Luigi Scalfaro
Prime Minister – Romano Prodi (until 21 October) / Massimo D'Alema (starting 21 October)

Events

January
3 January - The public debt is diminished by nearly 50 billions.

Full date unknown
FIGD Italian Golf Federation For Disabled is founded.

Births
 January 8 – Manuel Locatelli, footballer

Deaths
 September 26 – Giovanni Barbini, Italian naval officer (b. 1901)

See also
 1999 in Italian television
 List of Italian films of 1999

References

 
Years of the 20th century in Italy
1990s in Italy
Italy
Italy